Philippe Toussaint (born 30 June 1949) was one of Belgium's most successful golfers.

Toussaint was born in Brussels. As an amateur he won the Italian Amateur Championship, was runner up in the Belgian Amateur Championship, and twice represented Belgium in the Eisenhower Trophy. He turned professional in 1971 and joined the European Tour. He won one tournament during his time on the tour, at the 1974 Benson & Hedges Festival, when he edged out Bob Shearer in a sudden death playoff.

Toussaint also represented Belgium in the World Cup on ten occasions, as well as appearing in several other team events.

Amateur wins
1968 French Junior Championship
1969 Italian Amateur Championship

Professional wins (1)

European Tour wins (1)

European Tour playoff record (1–0)

Results in major championships

Note: Toussaint only played in The Open Championship.

CUT = missed the half-way cut (3rd round cut in 1977 Open Championship)
"T" = tied

Team appearances
Amateur
Eisenhower Trophy (representing Belgium): 1966, 1970
St Andrews Trophy (representing the Continent of Europe): 1968, 1970

Professional
World Cup (representing Belgium): 1971, 1973, 1974, 1975, 1976, 1977, 1978, 1979, 1982, 1987
Marlboro Nations' Cup/Philip Morris International (representing Belgium): 1973, 1975, 1976
Hennessy Cognac Cup (representing the Continent of Europe): 1976
Double Diamond International (representing Continental Europe): 1977

References

External links

Belgian male golfers
European Tour golfers
Sportspeople from Brussels
1949 births
Living people